Microsarotis samaruana is a moth of the family Tortricidae. It is found in Nigeria.

The wingspan is about 9 mm. The forewings are greyish with brownish suffusions. The ground colour is preserved as two pairs of white dorsal lines divided by and edged with brown. The costal strigulae are white. The hindwings are brownish, but whiter basally.

Etymology
The species name refers to Samaru, the type locality.

References

Moths described in 2013
Grapholitini